is a town located in Shiribeshi Subprefecture, Hokkaido, Japan. As of September 2016, the town had an estimated population of 3,265, and a density of 17 persons per km2.

Geography

Furubira occupies the eastern end of the north coast of the Shakotan Peninsula facing the Japan Sea. The town is largely built around the Furubira River, which runs from the highlands of the Shakotan Peninsula into the Japan Sea.

Neighboring municipalities

Shakotan
Kamoenai
Tomari
Niki
Yoichi

History

Furubira was established as one of many Pacific herring fishing settlements in the region at the beginning of the Edo period (1603 – 1868). The town was formally incorporated in 1902.

Economy

Manganese was once mined at the head of the Furubira River; mining ceased in the town in 1984. The mine was located at Inakuraishi.

The Port of Furubira, located near Cape Maruyama, is an active fishing port. Shrimp, Alaska pollack, and saltwater clams are a mainstay of the economy. The Furubira River provides irrigation for the production of rice, potatoes, and soybeans. Beef, pork, and poultry are also raised in the town.

Education
Hokkaido Furubira High School closed in 2012.
 Furubira Elementary School
 Furubira Junior High School

References

External links

Official Website 

Towns in Hokkaido